Marko Bilić, also spelt as Marco Bilic is a Bosnian-Croatian football manager. He is a retired football goalkeeper, playing for FK Sarajevo. He also  played for Cleveland Stokers in the 1968 North American Soccer League season.

Coaching
Bilic has worked as coach or his former club Sarajevo, firstly as a youth coach and then as head coach, guiding the team to the Yugoslavian championship in 1985. He also coached in Bangladesh for Abahani Krira Chakra soccer club.

Malaysia
Bilic was employed in Malaysia by several teams in the early 1990s, starting with Johor FA in 1990, then Perak FA in 1991 and Malacca FA in 1992. He also served as technical consultant for Terengganu FA from 1992 to 1994 specializing in youth development, and also coached the team in the latter half of 1993.

References

Year of birth missing (living people)
Living people
Association football goalkeepers
Yugoslav footballers
FK Sarajevo players
NK Trešnjevka players
NK Zagreb players
Cleveland Stokers players
Toronto Croatia players
North American Soccer League (1968–1984) players
Yugoslav expatriate footballers
Expatriate soccer players in the United States
Yugoslav expatriate sportspeople in the United States
Expatriate soccer players in Canada
Yugoslav expatriate sportspeople in Canada
Yugoslav football managers
FK Sarajevo managers
Abahani Limited Dhaka managers
Perak F.C. managers
Croatian football managers
Yugoslav expatriate football managers
Expatriate football managers in Bangladesh
Expatriate football managers in Malaysia
Yugoslav expatriate sportspeople in Malaysia
Croatian expatriate football managers
Croatian expatriate sportspeople in Malaysia